The Grũsi or Gurunsi languages, also known as the East Mabia languages, are a group of Gur languages, comprising about 20 languages spoken by the Gurunsi peoples. The Grũsi languages are spoken in northern Ghana, adjacent areas of Burkina Faso and Togo. The largest language in the Grusi group is Kabiye, a language spoken by approximately 1.2 million people (of which 550,000 are native speakers) throughout central Togo.

Languages
Eastern: Lukpa, Kabiyé, Tem, Lama, Delo, Bago-Kusuntu, Chala
Northern: Lyélé, Nuni, Kalamsé, Pana, Kasem
Western: Winyé, Deg, Phuie, Paasaal–Sisaala, Chakali, Siti, Tampulma, Vagla

According to Kleinewillinghöfer (2002), the western Southeastern Gurunsi languages Cala and Dulo are influenced by Kwa languages. The eastern Southeastern Gurunsi languages Bago and Kusuntu display less external influences, but have some influence from Yoruboid languages.

See also
List of Proto-Gurunsi reconstructions (Wiktionary)

References

 
Gur languages